Dover Business College was a vocational school and technical college with locations in Dover and Clifton, New Jersey. Dover Business College, which was founded in 1958 and accredited in 1974, was a private institution with a focus on preparing students for careers in healthcare, information technology, and business. The college awarded more than 2,800 diplomas in its last five years.

The school was merged into Berkeley College on July 1, 2013. Many of the programs that were offered at Dover Business College are now available at Berkeley College via the college's School of Health Studies, which was established to coincide with the merger.

Berkeley College has six New Jersey locations following the Dover acquisition. Locations are in Clifton, Dover, Newark, Paramus, Woodbridge, and Woodland Park. The college also has three New York locations in Manhattan, Brooklyn, and White Plains. The school also offers programs through Berkeley College Online.

References

External links
Berkeley College - official site
 - Clifton campus
 - Dover campus

Vocational education
Universities and colleges in Morris County, New Jersey
Universities and colleges in Passaic County, New Jersey